Profronde van Tiel is an elite men's and women's professional road bicycle racing event held annually in Tiel, Netherlands after the Tour de France. Since 2013 the event also includes a women's race. In 2018 the organizers announced that the race would not be held in that year and would possibly not come back in the near future.

Honours

Men's 

Source

Women's

References

External links
 

Women's road bicycle races
Men's road bicycle races
Defunct cycling races in the Netherlands
Cycling in Tiel